Miguel Ángel Nieto de la Calle (born 12 January 1986) is a Spanish professional footballer who plays as a right winger.

Club career
A Real Madrid youth graduate, Nieto was born in San Sebastián de los Reyes, Community of Madrid, and spent his first three professional seasons with its C-team. He sometimes trained with and was called up to the main squad, as against Racing de Santander (18 November 2006) and Valencia CF (27 November), as an unused substitute.

Nieto made his first-team debut in a match with FC Dynamo Kyiv for the 2006–07 edition of the UEFA Champions League, in a final group stage tie that ended with a 2–2 away draw. His La Liga debut was against Villarreal CF on 27 January 2007, and he also appeared the next week against Levante UD for two consecutive 0–1 defeats, although Madrid would be crowned league champions; in the latter match the player, who had replaced an injured Robinho, tried his luck with a shot which sliced the woodwork of José Francisco Molina's goal.

After spending one full season with Real Madrid Castilla in the third division, Nieto signed a five-year deal with 2007–08's top flight overachievers UD Almería on 1 July 2008, after finishing his contract with Real Madrid. Rarely played in his first year he did score an important goal, in a 3–1 home win against Sporting de Gijón on 10 May 2009 which confirmed that the Andalusians would remain in the top level for a further year.

In late January 2011, having been severely undermined by injury problems under both Juan Manuel Lillo and his successor José Luis Oltra but also being deemed surplus to requirements during Hugo Sánchez's tenure as coach, Nieto was loaned to another side in the region, second level's Xerez CD, until the end of the campaign, also being rarely used. In July, he left the Estadio de los Juegos Mediterráneos.

Honours
Real Madrid
La Liga: 2006–07

Racing Santander
Segunda División B: 2013–14

References

External links

1986 births
Living people
Footballers from Madrid
Spanish footballers
Association football wingers
La Liga players
Segunda División players
Segunda División B players
Tercera División players
Real Madrid C footballers
Real Madrid Castilla footballers
Real Madrid CF players
UD Almería players
Xerez CD footballers
CD Numancia players
Racing de Santander players
Córdoba CF players
Lleida Esportiu footballers
Hércules CF players
CD Alcoyano footballers